Irazepine (Ro 7-1986/1) is a benzodiazepine derivative containing isothiocyanate functional group. It is a non-competitive benzodiazepine binding site antagonist. Irazepine and other alkylating benzodiazepines, such as kenazepine, bind to brain benzodiazepine receptors in a non-competitive (covalent) fashion in vitro, and may exert a long-lasting anticonvulsant effect.

References 

Anticonvulsants
Benzodiazepines
Chloroarenes
GABAA receptor positive allosteric modulators
Isothiocyanates
Lactams
Fluoroarenes